The Pegaso VEC-M1 is a Spanish military cavalry reconnaissance vehicle. It started service in the Spanish Army in 1980 as BMR-625 VEC (a.k.a. Pegaso 3562) and all of them were upgraded in late 1990s to the M1 version.

Technical characteristics 

The vehicle was developed and produced by Pegaso, now Iveco, as a derivative of the well-known Pegaso BMR. It is a 6x6, currently powered by a 315 hp Scania DS9 diesel 6-cylinder engine, disposed in the rear right side of the hull, which replaced the original Pegaso 306 hp engine.

It mounts an automatic 25 mm chain gun (M242 Bushmaster) into a two-man turret and a coaxial 7.62 mm MG3S machine gun. Six electrically fired smoke grenade launchers are located on the sides of the turret, three on the left side and three on the right. It had amphibious ability, as two hydrojets for displacement in water were an optional equipment.

The crew in composed by five men: the commander, the gunner, the driver and two scouts.

Operators

: Employed the VEC in combat in the Balkans, Lebanon, Sinai and in the Iraq War, where they were favoured by their crews and command because of their good all-round capabilities, mechanical reliability, armor and firepower. However, the VEC achieved a bad reputation being prone to overturn.
   Guyana Defence Force (GDF).

See also 
 List of armoured fighting vehicles by country

External links

VEC-M1 on Army Recognition page (in French)
VEC (and BMR) data (in Spanish)

Wheeled reconnaissance vehicles
Armoured fighting vehicles of Spain
Reconnaissance vehicles
Wheeled military vehicles
Reconnaissance vehicles of the Cold War
Military vehicles introduced in the 1980s